The 1996 Asian Junior Women's Volleyball Championship was held in Chiang Mai, Thailand

Results

|}

Final standing

References
Results (Archived 2014-10-18)

1996 in women's volleyball
V
International volleyball competitions hosted by Thailand
2007
1996 in youth sport
1996 in Thai women's sport